The Fellowship of Southern Writers is an American literary organization that celebrates the creative vitality of Southern writing as the mirror of a distinctive and cherished regional culture. Its fellowships and awards draw attention to outstanding literary achievement and help to nurture new talent.

The fellowship was founded in 1987 in Chattanooga, Tennessee by 21 Southern writers and other literary luminaries. . The group meets in every odd-numbered year, usually during the SouthWord Literature Festival hosted by the Southern Lit Alliance in Chattanooga, TN.  Southern Literature.

Charter members

 A.R. Ammons    
 Cleanth Brooks 
 Fred Chappell
 George Core 
 James Dickey    
 Ralph Ellison    
 Horton Foote    
 Shelby Foote 
 John Hope Franklin    
 Ernest J. Gaines
 George Garrett    
 Blyden Jackson 
 Madison Jones    
 Andrew Nelson Lytle    
 Walker Percy    
 Reynolds Price 
 Louis D. Rubin, Jr.   
 Mary Lee Settle    
 Lewis P. Simpson    
 Elizabeth Spencer 
 William Styron   
 Walter Sullivan    
 Peter Taylor 
 Robert Penn Warren 
 Eudora Welty    
 C. Vann Woodward

Elected members

George Singleton 2013
 Wendell Berry (1990) 
 Ellen Douglas (Josephine Haxton) (1990) 
 C. Eric Lincoln (1990) 
 Romulus Linney (1990) 
 Lee Smith (1993) 
 Monroe Spears (1993) 
 Charles Wright (1993) 
 Doris Betts (1995) 
 Marsha Norman (1995) 
 James Applewhite (1997) 
 Richard Bausch (1997) 
 Clyde Edgerton (1997) 
 Gail Godwin (1997) 
 William Hoffman (1997)
 Donald Justice (1997) 
 Dave Smith (1997) 
 Joseph Blotner (2001) 
 Allan Gurganus (2001) 
 Beth Henley (2001) 
 Josephine Humphreys (2001) 
 Bobbie Ann Mason (2001) 
 Henry Taylor (2001) 
 Madison Smartt Bell (2003) 
 Kaye Gibbons (2003) 
 Barry Hannah (2003) 
 Yusef Komunyakaa (2003) 
 Jill McCorkle (2003) 
 John Shelton Reed (2003) 
 Ellen Bryant Voigt (2003) 
 Allen Wier (2003) 
 Larry Brown (2005)
 Percival Everett (2005) 
 Robert Morgan (2005) 
 Lewis Nordan (2005) 
 Sam Pickering (2005) 
 Wyatt Prunty (2005) 
 Dorothy Allison (2007)
 Roy Blount, Jr. (2007)
 Andrew Hudgins (2007)
 Randall Kenan (2007)
 Shannon Ravenel (2007)
 Alfred Uhry (2007)
 Will D. Campbell (2009)
 Rita Dove (2009)
 Percival Everett (2009)
 Jim Grimsley (2009)
 Edward P. Jones (2009)
 Fred Hobson (2009)
 Rodney Jones (2009)
 Eleanor Ross Taylor (2009)
 Natasha Trethewey (2009)
 Al Young (2009)
 Tony Earley (2010)
 Claudia Emerson (2011)
 Steve Yarbrough (2015)

Awards and honors
 The Hillsdale Prize for Fiction 
 The Hanes Prize for Poetry 
 The Robert Penn Warren Award for Fiction 
 The Bryan Family Foundation Award for Drama 
 The Cecil Woods, Jr. Prize for Non-Fiction 
 The Fellowship's New Writing Award for Fiction 
 The C. Vann Woodward-John Hope Franklin Prize for the Writing of Southern History
 The James Still Award for Writing About the Appalachian South 
 The Fellowship's New Award for Poetry 
 The Cleanth Brooks Medal for Distinguished Achievement in Southern Letters

See also
American Literature
Southern literature
Southern United States

References

External links
The Fellowship of Southern Writers official website
Arts & Education Council website
Oral History Interview with Blyden Jackson from Oral Histories of the American South

Southern United States literature
American writers' organizations
Organizations based in Chattanooga, Tennessee
Arts organizations established in 1987
1987 establishments in the United States